Self-Portrait. Between the Clock and the Bed is a 1940-1943 self-portrait painting by Edvard Munch, and is one of his last major works. He depicts himself as an unhappy, aging older man. Behind him is a bright room full of light and past paintings, but he has placed his current self between a clock and a bed, symbolising the inevitable passing of time and where he will eventually lie down for the final time.

References 

Paintings by Edvard Munch
Paintings in the collection of the Munch Museum
1940s paintings
Self-portraits